The 2010–11 season was Queen of the South's ninth consecutive season in the Scottish First Division, having been promoted from the Scottish Second Division at the end of the 2001–02 season. Queens also competed in the Challenge Cup, League Cup and the Scottish Cup.

First team transfers
From end of 2009–10 season, to last match of season 2010–11

In

Out

Squad (that played for first team)

Fixtures and results

Friendlies

Irn-Bru Scottish Football League First Division

Active Nation Scottish Cup

League Cup

Challenge Cup

League table

References

See also 

2010-11
Queen of the South